Governor Olson may refer to:

Allen I. Olson (born 1938), 28th Governor of North Dakota
Culbert Olson (1876–1962), 29th Governor of California
Floyd B. Olson (1891–1936), 22nd Governor of Minnesota
Ole H. Olson (1872–1954), 18th Governor of North Dakota